Henrik Avellan (15 May 1902 – 28 May 1991) was a Finnish modern pentathlete. He competed at the 1924 and 1928 Summer Olympics.

References

External links
 

1902 births
1991 deaths
Sportspeople from Vyborg
People from Viipuri Province (Grand Duchy of Finland)
Finnish male modern pentathletes
Olympic modern pentathletes of Finland
Modern pentathletes at the 1924 Summer Olympics
Modern pentathletes at the 1928 Summer Olympics